Paola Hernández may refer to:
 Paola Hernández (fashion designer)
 Paola Hernández (footballer)